José Angel Florencio Robles López (born 8 October 1964) is a retired male road racing cyclist from Colombia. He competed for his native country at the 1992 Summer Olympics, finishing in 49th place in the Men's Individual Road Race. Colombia competed with three cyclists in this event; the other ones being Héctor Palacio (52nd) and Libardo Niño (76th). He was nicknamed El Panamericano during his career.

References

External links

1964 births
Living people
Colombian male cyclists
Cyclists at the 1992 Summer Olympics
Olympic cyclists of Colombia
People from Cundinamarca Department
20th-century Colombian people